ØIF Arendal Elite is a Norwegian handball team located in Arendal. Their home matches are played at Sparebanken Sør Amfi. They compete in Eliteserien, which is the highest league for men's handball clubs in Norway.

European record

Team

Current squad

Squad for the 2019-20 season

Goalkeepers
 1  Kristijan Jurisic
 12  André Bergsholm Kristensen
Wingers
RW
 10  Sondre Paulsen
 81  Sander Løvlie Simonsen
LW
 9  Andre Lindboe
 17  Olaf Richter Hoffstad
Line players
 15  Laurits Mo Rannekleiv
 22  Jesper Munk Johanson
 23  Luigj Quni

Back players
 4  Oscar Duus Carlsen
 5  Kristoffer Pedersen
 11  Jørg William Fiala Gjermundsnes
 13  Niklas Moltke Kristensen
 20  Kjetil Åndal
 23  Maximilian Jonsson

Former club members

Notable former players
  Robert Markotić (2015–2016)

References

External links

Handball clubs established in 1929
1929 establishments in Norway
Norwegian handball clubs
Arendal